Rekoa malina is a butterfly in the family Lycaenidae. It is found in Brazil and Argentina.

References

Butterflies described in 1867
Eumaeini
Lycaenidae of South America
Taxa named by William Chapman Hewitson